Joan Wolfe may refer to:

 Joan Luedders Wolfe, Michigan environmentalist
 Joan Pearl Wolfe, young English woman murdered in 1942 by Canadian soldier August Sangret